Sophea Duch ( pronounced ) is a popular Karaoke song artist. She was born in Phnom Penh, Cambodia. She is currently very popular among the younger generation in Phnom Penh, the rest of Cambodia and in other South Eastern Asian countries.

While there are numerous sites mentioning her music and personal life, the information at these sites is still rather sketchy at best.
 
It is known that she was born in 1986, to a family that eventually grew into one with nine children. She started singing at very early age. Later she was discovered by the manager of a local band and started appearing on Cambodian television as a child singing starlet in the same year.

She either sang or took minor supporting roles in 20 Khmer movies, mostly as guest to her friends who worked in the movie industry.

It is believed there are currently at least 500 Khmer music CD titles with her name on the list of artists.

She has an elder sister, whose name is Somphors Duch. She is also a popular actress currently working for a Cambodian television network.

Movies
Her name appeared in the cast for 20 or so Khmer language titles.

Music
 <<Sexy Baby>> - Karaoke CD (1996)
 <<Dalama 1, 2, 3>> - Khmer language Karaoke titles
 up to 500 other solo or joint CD titles in English and Khmer language

External links
  Recent news about Sophea Duch
  Unofficial profile by Angkorthom

Living people
21st-century Cambodian women singers
20th-century Cambodian women singers
People from Phnom Penh
Year of birth missing (living people)